William Neil Graham  (born ) is a New Zealand boxing trainer and former amateur boxer. He won four New Zealand titles at light welterweight, plus an Australasian title and the Jamieson Belt.

Born in Naenae, and trained by the legendary Dick Dunn, Graham's amateur career was outstanding. He did not turn pro, but in the late 1960s Bob Jones wrote the following about young Graham:

When Graham was 28, his coach told him it was time to stop boxing. Graham left boxing after 18 years in the ring without ever having taken a blow to the head. He now runs the Naenae Boxing Academies in Naenae and Cannons creek, These academies help kids of the street and save their childhoods which has gained recognition from several newspapers.

Honours and awards
In 2011, Graham was named the Local Community Hero of the Year at the New Zealander of the Year awards.

In the 2020 Queen's Birthday Honours, Graham was appointed a Member of the New Zealand Order of Merit, for services to youth and the community.

References

External links
Billy Graham
Billy Graham's Naenae Boxing Academy
Billy Graham Naenae Charitable Trust

Sportspeople from Lower Hutt
New Zealand boxing trainers
New Zealand male boxers
Light-welterweight boxers
Members of the New Zealand Order of Merit
1940s births
Year of birth uncertain
Living people